Stolbovo is a rural locality (a village) in Shelotskoye Rural Settlement, Verkhovazhsky District, Vologda Oblast, Russia. The population was 14 as of 2002.

Geography 
Stolbovo is located 70 km southwest of Verkhovazhye (the district's administrative centre) by road. Akinkhovskaya is the nearest rural locality.

References 

Rural localities in Verkhovazhsky District